The Emirates Triangular Tournament was a One-day International cricket tri-series involving touring nations Sri Lanka and South Africa against each other and hosts England, in the 1998 international season. Sri Lanka won the tournament by defeating England in the final, thanks to an unbeaten 132 by player of the tournament Marvan Atapattu.

These matches were the first official One-day Internationals played in England in coloured clothing, with England wearing light blue, South Africa in green and Sri Lanka in dark blue.

Group Stage table

Table key
P = Games played
W = Games won
L = Games lost
NR = Games with no result
T = Games tied
NRR = Net run rate

Points system
Won = 2 points
Lost = 0 points
Tie or No result = 1 point
Standard net run rate rules applied.

Position deciders
The deciding factors, in order, on table position were:
Total points
Head-to-head result
Net run rate

Group Stage matches

Match 1: South Africa v Sri Lanka

Match 2: England v Sri Lanka

Match 3: England v South Africa
 

Because England and Sri Lanka had the best run rates, they were ranked as the top two teams. England beat Sri Lanka and finished top of the group. South Africa's run rate meant they missed out on the final, despite having beaten England, and that a better run rate than Sri Lanka would have put them top of the table.

Final
 

Marvan Atapattu was named player of the tournament for his 356 run contribution to the victorious Sri Lankan side.

References
CricketArchive
CricketArchive: ODI series averages
Cricinfo

See also
Sri Lankan cricket team in England in 1998
South African cricket team in England in 1998

Emirates Triangular Tournament, 1998
Emirates Triangular Tournament, 1998
International cricket competitions from 1997–98 to 2000